Gaylord Montier (born 4 April 1986) is a French Muay thai fighter. He is the current WKN World Featherweight Kickboxing champion and the former ISKA World Bantamweight and WAKO European Flyweight champion.

Muay Thai career
In December 2011, he fought Thepsutin for the WPMF World Super Bantamweight title. Montier lost the fight by decision.

Motnier came back after a two-year absence from the sport, and defeated Thibaud Duphil by decision during Warrior's Night. He fought Ivano Siviero during Le Choc Des Mondes, and won the bout by a second-round TKO.

In 2015, Gaylord fought Tukatatong Sor Kiatniwat for the ISKA World Bantamweight Muaythai title. He won the fight by decision.

In 2016, Montier fought only once, against Wuthichai. He won the fight by unanimous decision.

Montier was scheduled to fight Muangsee Pumpanmuang during Choc Des Mondes for the vacant WKN World Featherweight Kickboxing title. Montier knocked Muangsee out in the third round.

Championships and accomplishments
 2009 WAKO European Flyweight Champion
 2015 ISKA World Bantamweight Muaythai Champion
 2018 WKN World Featherweight Kickboxing Champion

Fight record

|-  bgcolor="#cfc"
| 2018-6-2|| Win ||align=left| Muangsee Pumpanmuang || Choc Des Mondes || Caudry, France || KO || 3 || 
|-
! style=background:white colspan=9 |
|-  bgcolor="#cfc"
| 2016-5-13|| Win ||align=left| Wuthichai || Partouche Kickboxing Tour 2016 || Saint-Amand-les-Eaux, France || Decision (Unanimous) || 3 || 3:00
|-  bgcolor="#cfc"
| 2015-4-11 || Win ||align=left| Tukatatong Sor Kiatniwat || Choc Des Mondes || Caudry, France || Decision (Unanimous) || 5 || 3:00
|-
! style=background:white colspan=9 |
|-  bgcolor="#cfc"
| 2014-6-7 || Win ||align=left| Ivano Siviero || Le Choc Des Mondes || Bruay-sur-l'Escaut, France || TKO || 2 ||
|-  bgcolor="#cfc"
| 2014-4-4 || Win ||align=left| Thibaud Duphil || Warriors Night || Paris, France || Decision (Unanimous) || 3 || 3:00
|-  bgcolor="#fbb"
| 2012-3-24 || Loss ||align=left| Amine Kacem || Choc Des Mondes VII || Bruay-sur-l'Escaut, France || Decision (Unanimous) || 5 || 3:00
|-
! style=background:white colspan=9 |
|-  bgcolor="#cfc"
| 2012-2-11 || Win ||align=left| Amine Zitouni || Choc Des Mondes VII || Oberkorn, Luxembourg || Decision (Unanimous) || 3 || 3:00
|-  bgcolor="#fbb"
| 2011-12-4 || Loss ||align=left| Thepsutin || King's Birthday || Pattaya, Thailand || Decision (Unanimous) || 5 || 3:00
|-
! style=background:white colspan=9 |
|-  bgcolor="#cfc"
| 2011-11-26 || Win ||align=left| Tarek Krab || La soirée des revanches || Roncq, France || Decision (Unanimous) || 3 || 3:00
|-  bgcolor="#cfc"
| 2011-3-26 || Win ||align=left| Paulo Da Silva || Le Choc des Mondes VI || Bruay-sur-l'Escaut, France || Decision (Unanimous) || 3 || 3:00
|-  bgcolor="#cfc"
| 2010-4-10 || Win ||align=left| Tarek Krab || Le Choc des Mondes V || Bruay-sur-l'Escaut, France || Decision (Unanimous) || 3 || 3:00
|-  bgcolor="#fbb"
| 2010-3-28 || Loss ||align=left| Sayannoi Lookhuetanon || France VS Thaïlande || Reims, France || Decision (Unanimous) || 3 || 3:00
|-  bgcolor="#fbb"
| 2009-10-31 || Loss ||align=left| Tarek Kreb || Who's The Best || Charleroi, Belgium || DQ || 2 || 
|-
! style=background:white colspan=9 |
|-  bgcolor="#fbb"
| 2009-6-27 || Loss ||align=left| Sitthichai Khomahae || La Nuit des Gladiateurs || Saint-Nazaire, France || TKO || 2 ||
|-  bgcolor="#cfc"
| 2009-5-2 || Win ||align=left| Artit Shapadit || France VS Thaïlande || Epinal, France || Decision (Unanimous) || 3 || 3:00
|-  bgcolor="#cfc"
| 2009-4-18 || Win ||align=left| Mohamed Bouchareb || Le Choc des Mondes IV || Bruay-sur-l'Escaut, France || KO || 5 || 
|-
! style=background:white colspan=9 |
|-  bgcolor="#cfc"
| 2009-2-28 || Win ||align=left| Amine Zitouni || La Nuit Du Siam 5 || Houplines, France || Decision (Unanimous) || 3 || 3:00
|-  bgcolor="#cfc"
| 2008-12-20 || Win ||align=left| AbdelOuahab Yalmani || Le Choc des Mondes IV || Bruay-sur-l'Escaut, France || KO || 2 ||
|-  bgcolor="#fbb"
| 2008-6-22 || Loss ||align=left| Said Youb || Gala Kun Khmer - Muaythai || Vieux-Condé, France || Decision (Unanimous) || 5 || 3:00
|-
! style=background:white colspan=9 |
|-  bgcolor="#fbb"
| 2008-4-12 || Loss ||align=left| Mohamed Bouchareb || Le Choc des Mondes III || Saint-Amand-les-Eaux, France || KO || 4 ||
|-
|-
| colspan=9 | Legend:

See also
List of male kickboxers

References

Living people
1986 births
Flyweight kickboxers
French Muay Thai practitioners
Sportspeople from Oise